Tellicherry Fort is in Thalassery (Tellicherry) a town in Kannur District of Kerala state in south India. Thalassery was one of the most important European trading centers of Kerala. The Fort lies on the group of low wooden hill running down to sea and protected by natural waters. It has been the main opening for the rich spices, hill products and timber of the vast inter-land.

The French came first to Tellicherry for trading, they got a strong grip at Mahé, Puducherry, 5 km south of Tellicherry town. Towards end of the 17th century the British opened a factory north of Tellicherry. Later they obtained a site from Vadakkelamkur,  the de facto ruler of Kolathunad and established a factory at Tellicherry in 1708. But the Udayamangalam branch of Kolathiri family and Korangoth Nair, the local chieftain resented this action and they attacked and caused serious damage to English property. In order to safe guard their trade activities with the support of the Kolathiri Raja they build a fort around the out laying hills of Tellicherry. The French occupation of Mahé, Puducherry in 1725 compelled the British Company to strengthen the fortification  to establish a stronghold on the Malabar Coast. In 1736, the British took the possession of Dharmadam Island. The British sustained strong military establishment at Tellicherry, from 1776 to 1784.

In 1781 Hyder Ali, ruler of the Kingdom of Mysore, was unsuccessful in capturing the Fort in his campaign to control Malabar. His successor, Tipu Sultan, was forced to cede Malabar District to the British in 1792, at the conclusion of the Third Anglo-Maratha War.

The Tellicherry fort over looking the sea, raises to height of 10m and it is oblong on pian. It was built out of laterite blocks with high round holed walls and strong flanking bastions. The small redoubts on most of the out playing hills have long since disappeared, but Tellicherry fort is in fair state of preservation. The square fort, with its massive walls, strong flanking bastions, secret tunnels to the sea and intricately carved huge doors, is an imposing structure. A light house marks the site of an old redoubt. The fort was once the nucleus of Thalassery's development. Tellicherry was also famous for the cricket match played between the Europeans and local teams in the town near the seashore, which used to attract enormous crowds during those days. This is a centrally protected monument under the control of Archaeological Survey of India since 1921.

See also
Mysore invasion of Kerala
Overbury's folly
Thalassery Pier (Kadalpalam)
Payyambalam Beach
Meenkunnu Beach
Parassinikkadavu Snake Park
Muthappan temple
Kannur
Sacred Heart Girls High School
Kannur Fort - (St. Angelo Fort)

References

External links

1708 establishments in the British Empire
Forts in Kerala
Mysorean invasion of Malabar
Tourist attractions in Kannur district
Archaeological sites in Kerala
Buildings and structures in Thalassery
Monuments of National Importance in Kerala
Star forts